A list of American films released in 1978.

The Deer Hunter won the Academy Award for Best Picture of 1978.
 Superman was the highest-grossing film of 1978.



A-B

C-G

H-L

M-S

T-Z

Documentaries and other films

See also
 1978 in American television
 1978 in the United States

External links

1978 films at the Internet Movie Database
List of 1978 box office number-one films in the United States

1978
Films
Lists of 1978 films by country or language